Alma Adamkienė (née Nutautaitė; February 10, 1927) is a Lithuanian philologist and philanthropist. She is the wife of the former President of Lithuania, Valdas Adamkus, and was First Lady during his two terms (1998–2003 and 2004–2009). She also holds United States citizenship. She has no children.

Early life

Adamkienė was born in Šiauliai. Her father, Stasys Nutautas, was a businessman; her mother, Ona Soblytė-Nutautienė, assisted her husband in various commercial activities. In 1944, when the Soviet Army returned to Lithuania, Alma Nutautaitė fled with her family to the West. She finished high school in Germany, and later studied Philology at Erlangen University in Nuremberg.

Life in the United States

Alma Nutautaitė emigrated to the United States of America in 1949. She first worked as a laboratory assistant at a steel factory. Later, she took a position with an insurance company. She also organized and participated in Lithuanian émigré activities. Alma Nutautaitė married Valdas Adamkus in 1951, and took her husband's surname (she is known as Alma Adamkus in the United States).

First Lady

During the presidential election held in Lithuania in 1997, Valdas Adamkus campaigned for the Presidency and won. After Adamkus became president, Adamkienė became involved in various Lithuanian social programs focusing on the welfare of children. She opened a foundation, the Alma Adamkienė Charity and Support Fund, in 1999.

Honours 

1998 : Member 1st Class of the Order of Prince Yaroslav the Wise

2001 : Grand Cross of the Order of the Three Stars

2004 : Member 1st Class of the Order of the White Star

2006 : Grand Cross in the Order of the Crown.

2007 : Grand Cross of the Order of Prince Henry

2009 : Grand Officer of the Order of Merit of the Republic of Poland

References

External links

Alma Adamkienė Charity and Support Fund 

|-

|-

1927 births
First ladies of Lithuania
American people of Lithuanian descent
Living people
Lithuanian emigrants to the United States
Grand Crosses of the Order of the Crown (Belgium)
Grand Crosses of the Order of the Crown (Netherlands)
People from Šiauliai
University of Erlangen-Nuremberg alumni
Recipients of the Order of Prince Yaroslav the Wise, 1st class
Recipients of the Order of the White Star, 1st Class